Chantelle Lee Newbery  (née Michell) (born 6 May 1977) is an Australian former diver. She won a gold medal in diving at the 2004 Summer Olympics, and in 2006 became the 22nd athlete to be named in the Australian Institute of Sport Awards' "Best of the Best".

Career
Born in Melbourne, Newbury's first international success was at the 1998 World Aquatics Championships in Perth, Australia, where she won a bronze medal in the 3m springboard event. Later that year Newbery became Commonwealth champion by winning the gold medal in the 1m springboard event at the 1998 Commonwealth Games in Kuala Lumpur, Malaysia. She won a silver medal two days later in the 3m springboard.

At the 2000 Olympic Games Newbery finished fourth in the synchronised 3m springboard event. Four years later, she won a gold medal in the 10m platform event at the 2004 Athens Summer Olympic Games ahead of Lao Lishi of China and fellow Australian Loudy Tourky.

In the 2005 Australia Day Honours Newbery was a recipient of the Medal of the Order of Australia (OAM). Also in 2005, she was inducted into the Australian Institute of Sport 'Best of the Best'.

Personal life
Newbery took time away from diving for almost a year while pregnant with her first child. She gave birth to her son Jet in 2002. In May 2004, she married fellow diver Robert Newbery; they both competed for Australia at the 2000 and 2004 Olympics. Their second son, Ryder, was born in 2006. The couple later divorced.

In 2009 Newbery told Australian magazine Woman's Day that she was admitting herself to a psychiatric hospital for severe depression. She had also made suicide attempts.

In 2014, Newbery pled guilty to drug charges and was placed in a drug diversion programme after being arrested in possession of methamphetamine. In November 2018, Newbery was charged with six counts of theft, leading to a three-month prison sentence. Her sentence was suspended and she was released on parole.

In 2021, Newbery was caught with an ice pipe while shoplifting. She pleaded guilty to stealing and possessing drug utensils.

In January 2023, Newbery pleaded guilty to stealing groceries in July 2022 and for unlicensed driving in December 2022. She was sentenced to eight months jail but released on parole immediately as she had to care for her 18-month-old niece. She was also disqualified from holding or obtaining a driver’s licence for a month.

References

Australian female divers
Olympic divers of Australia
Divers at the 1998 Commonwealth Games
Divers at the 2000 Summer Olympics
Divers at the 2004 Summer Olympics
Divers at the 2006 Commonwealth Games
Divers at the 2008 Summer Olympics
Olympic gold medalists for Australia
Olympic bronze medalists for Australia
Sportswomen from Victoria (Australia)
Australian Institute of Sport divers
Commonwealth Games gold medallists for Australia
Commonwealth Games silver medallists for Australia
1977 births
Living people
Olympic medalists in diving
Medalists at the 2004 Summer Olympics
Divers from Melbourne
Recipients of the Medal of the Order of Australia
World Aquatics Championships medalists in diving
Commonwealth Games medallists in diving
20th-century Australian women
21st-century Australian women
Medallists at the 1998 Commonwealth Games
Medallists at the 2006 Commonwealth Games